The Diplomatic Academy of Vietnam (also referred to as DAV), is a public research university located in Hanoi, Vietnam and an administrative unit under management of Ministry of Foreign Affairs of Vietnam. Founded in 1959, formerly known as "University of Foreign Affairs" or "Institute for International Relations", the Diplomatic Academy of Vietnam is known as a prestigious institution providing in-depth training, strategic research and forecasts on a wide range of pressing regional and global issues to the country's government. It is regarded as an elite training ground for future diplomats, leaders, civil servants, journalists and business executives in Vietnam.

The academy carries out strategic research and forecasts on world affairs, international relations, political and economic affairs, security, national defence, law, culture and foreign policies of different nations and regions. It serves as think tank for foreign policy, history and international relations theory. In the 2017 Global Go To Think Tank Index Report, the Diplomatic Academy of Vietnam ranked 40th amongst top 100 think tanks in the Southeast Asia and Pacific region.

History
The Diplomatic Academy of Vietnam was founded as the Faculty of International Relations of the University of Economics and Finance in 1959.

It was known as "School of Foreign Affairs and Foreign Trade" in 1964, "University of Foreign Affairs" in 1965, "Institute for International Relations Ministry of Foreign Affairs" in 1987, "Institute for International Relations" in 1992, and finally received its current name of Diplomatic Academy of Vietnam in accordance with Decision 82/2008/QD-TTg in 2008.

The Academy also established the "Institute for Foreign Policy and Strategic Studies" in 2008 and the "Institute of East Sea" in 2012 as its strategic research affiliates.

Academics

Divisions
The academy offers training at undergraduate and postgraduate levels in 5 divisions:

International Relations;
International Law;
International Economics;
Foreign Languages (English, French, Chinese);
International Communication.

Admissions
Admission to the Diplomatic Academy of Vietnam is considered to be highly selective due to its strictly limited offers (only 90 students per faculty) and highly competitive entrance score (with minimum score of 26/30 in national entrance examination). Each academic year, the academy admits 60 graduate and 450 undergraduate students in 5 disciplines: International Relations, International Law, International Economics, International Communication, and Foreign Language: English.

President Board

President: Nguyen Vu Tung.
Vice President: Pham Lan Dung.
Vice President: Le Hai Binh

Publications
First published in 1993, International Studies Review is a review of Vietnam in international relations and foreign policy studies. The Review carries articles on Vietnam's foreign policy, foreign policy of major world powers, international relations, international economic problems, international law, international relations theories and other international issues.

Its Vietnamese edition is published quarterly and its English edition biannually.

Notable alumni

Le Hai Binh: Former Ministry of Foreign Affairs spokesperson (2014–2017)
Uyen Linh: Vietnamese pop singer, Winner of Vietnam Idol (2010)
Le Thi Tuyet Mai: Ambassador and Permanent Representative of the Permanent Mission of Viet Nam to the United Nations Office and the World Trade Organization
Pham Binh Minh: Deputy Prime Minister, Minister of Foreign Affairs (2011-2021)
Dang Dinh Quy: Deputy Minister of Foreign Affairs
Bui Thanh Son: Deputy Minister of Foreign Affairs (2009-2021), Minister of Foreign Affairs (2021-)

References

Universities in Hanoi
Educational institutions established in 1959
1959 establishments in Vietnam
Diplomatic training